EOTC can be an acronym for:

 The Ethiopian Orthodox Tewahedo Church
 The Eritrean Orthodox Tewahedo Church
 Envy on the Coast, a rock band from Long Island, New York, U.S.
 End of Course Test, an academic assessment conducted in many states of the US by the State Board of Education